Vanessa Riopel (born May 22, 1990) is a Canadian baseball player from Quebec. She is a member of the Canada women's national baseball team which won a silver medal at the 2015 Pan American Games. She plays as a pitcher for the Victoriaville Laurier/Pub O'Connell of the Quebec Junior Major League Baseball (French: Ligue de baseball junior majeur du Québec).

Early life 
Vanessa Riopel was born in Repentigny, Quebec on May 22, 1990. Of note, she was born with a club foot.

Her father is Daniel Riopel and her mother is Céline Majeau. She started to play baseball at the age of 9.

Personal life 
She is in a relationship with Canadian soccer player Jessica Lavallée, who gave birth to a son on August 22, 2016.

Career 
She joined the Canada Women's National Baseball Team in 2007.

During the winter of 2009, she played for the Footscray Bulldogs in Melbourne, Australia.

Vanessa Riopel plays as a pitcher and a second base for the  Victoriaville Laurier/Pub O'Connell of the Quebec Junior Major League Baseball (French: Ligue de baseball junior majeur du Québec) in 2014. She is the only female to play in the league.

References

External links 
 Vanessa Riopel on Team Canada

People from Repentigny, Quebec
Canadian female baseball players
Baseball pitchers
1990 births
Living people
Canadian disabled sportspeople
Baseball players at the 2015 Pan American Games
Pan American Games silver medalists for Canada
Pan American Games medalists in baseball
Medalists at the 2015 Pan American Games